Greely Island is an island in Franz Josef Land, Arkhangelsk Oblast, Russia.

This island was named after American Arctic explorer Adolphus Greely.

Geography

Greely Island is part of the Zichy Land subgroup of the Franz Josef Archipelago. It is separated from Ziegler Island by a narrow sound.

Adjacent Islands

Kuhn Island
Kuhn Island (Russian: Остров Куна, Ostrov Kuna) is a large island with unglacierized shores lying off Greely Island's northern coastline.

Brosch Island
This island was named after Gustav Brosch, a naval lieutenant from Bohemia in the Austro-Hungarian North Pole Expedition.

Kane Island

Kane Island (Russian: Остров Кейна, Ostrov Keyna) is another large partly unglacierized island lying off Greely Island's northeastern shore, southeast of Kuhn Island and separated from it by a  narrow sound. Kane Island was named after American Arctic explorer Dr. Elisha Kent Kane.

View

See also 
 Franz Josef Land
 List of islands of Russia

References

External links 
Historical data

Islands of Franz Josef Land
Uninhabited islands of Russia